San Carlos Alzatate is a municipality in the Jalapa department of Guatemala.

References

Municipalities of the Jalapa Department